Pal Ëngjëlli (1416 – 1470) was an Albanian Roman Catholic cardinal, clergyman, scholar, and Archbishop of Durrës who in 1462 wrote the first known sentence retrieved so far in Albanian. Pal Ëngjëlli is reported to have been a friend, co-worker and close counselor of Skanderbeg. As his envoy, he frequently traveled abroad, seeking for aid in the war against the Ottoman Empire. Pal is the Northern Albanian version of Paul, and Ëngjëlli is the Albanian form of angel.

Ëngjëlli managed to convince Lekë Dukagjini to leave Ottomans and later reconcile with Skanderbeg, and also to convince Skanderbeg to violate an armistice signed with the Ottomans.

The Baptism Formula Document

The sentence was the baptismal formula in the Gheg Albanian: Un'te paghesont' pr'emenit t'Atit e t'Birit e t'Spertit Senit. and in the Tosk-based standard).

The formula was found in a pastoral letter written in Latin by Ëngjëlli after his visit to the Church of Holy Trinity in Mat. The letter is dated 8 November 1462. The formula was meant to be used by Albanian priests to render the ritual understandable for people ignorant of Latin. Probably it was meant also to be used by Albanian people in the countryside, unable to take their children to be baptized to a church. The formula was approved by a synod in Mat, Albania, in 1462.

The document containing the baptismal formula is held in the Biblioteca Medicea Laurenziana, Florence, Italy. It was discovered in 1915 by the Romanian scholar Nicolae Iorga.

See also
Pal Dushi
Pal Gazulli

References

Sources

1416 births
1470 deaths
15th-century Roman Catholic archbishops in Albania
Albanian diplomats
People from Durrës
Albanian cardinals